Ḥanan bar Rava (חנן/חנא/חנין בר רב/א) or Ḥanan bar Abba (חנן בר א/בא) was a Talmudic sage and second-generation Babylonian Amora. He lived in Israel, moved to Babylonia with Abba b. Aybo, and died there ca. 290 CE. He is distinct from the late-generation Babylonian Amora of the same name who apparently conversed with Ashi (352-427 CE).

Ḥanan b. Rava's father was not Abba b. Joseph b. Ḥama (called Rava in the Talmud), who lived a century later. Ḥanan b. Rava was the son-in-law of Abba b. Aybo (Rav), tutored Rav's son Hiyya b. Rav, and is often quoted relaying Rav's teachings or describing his customs. He was the father-in-law of Ḥisda, by whom he had at least seven grandsons, two granddaughters, two great-granddaughters, and four great-great-grandchildren, including Amemar b. Yenuqa.

Bizna, Z'era, Kahana b. Taḥlifa, Nachman b. Yaakov, G'neva, Ḥisda, Abin, and others relay his teachings in the Talmud.

In 1997, the Supreme Court of Israel cited Ḥanan b. Rava's dictum, "All know for what purpose a bride enters the bridal canopy. Yet against whomsoever speaks obscenely thereof, even if a sentence of seventy years happiness has been sealed for him, it is reversed for evil," in establishing guidelines for legal censorship of pornography.

Events 

 Ḥanan b. Rava taught a mishnah to Ḥiyya b. Rav in a booth of Rav's study hall: "An amputee may not exit with his prosthetic [on the Sabbath] -- the words of Meir; but Yose permits."  Rav signaled him: "Reverse them."
  Yehudah b. Ezekiel, Yirmiah b. Abba, and Ḥanan b. Rava traveled to the house of Abin of N'shiqya. Couches were brought out for Yehudah b. Ezekiel and Yirmiah b. Abba, but not for Ḥanan b. Rava, who was forced to sit on the ground. Ḥanan b. Rava became incensed, and provoked his host to an halakhic dispute.
 Ḥanan b. Rava thought that relatives were permitted to testify together about the coming of the New Moon because he had misattributed the two positions thereon. He was corrected by Huna.
 When the Exilarch died, Ḥisda instructed him to stand on a platform, tear his garments, and show them to the masses. By this the masses were instructed how to mourn the Exilarch.
 Ḥanan b. Rava went to his son-in-law Ḥisda's house. He took his granddaughter and put her in his lap. Ḥisda accused him of violating religious decency laws, but Ḥanan b. Rava insisted familial affection was permitted. In another version, Ḥanan b. Rava kissed his young granddaughter.
 Ḥanan b. Rava and his associates were sitting and eating on the Sabbath. After they had eaten and said Grace, Ḥanan b. Rava arose and departed. He returned, and found his associates saying Grace again! He asked, "Have we not already said Grace?" and the associates responded, "We said Grace, and then said Grace again, because we initially forgot to insert the Sabbath additions."
 Once Ḥanan b. Rava said to his associates, "Let me tell you something good I saw Rav do." He demonstrated the act. "And I said this before Shmuel b. Abba, and he rose and kissed me on my mouth."
 Rav was going to the house of his son-in-law Ḥanan b. Rava when he saw a ferry-boat approaching. He said, "A ferry-boat is approaching! It is an omen: tonight will be a yom tov for my stomach." Rav came to Ḥanan b. Rava's gate and looked through a crack in the door; he saw a spitted animal. He knocked on the gate, and everyone came to greet him, even the butchers. Rav did not lift his eyes from the animal, saying to them, "You would have fed forbidden meat to my grandchildren!" Rav did not eat from the animal.

Selected Teachings

Teachings in Rav's name 
 If an alley was breached in its side, carrying within that alley on the Sabbath is prohibited if the breach is ten cubits wide. If in the front, even if the breach is only four cubits wide."
 Four winds blow on each day, and the north wind with each of the others. Were this not so, the world would not survive a single hour.
 All leaders, even minor officials, are chosen by Heaven.
 There are five permanent idolatrous temples: the temple of Bel in Babylon, the temple of Nebo in Borsippa, the temple of Atargatis in Manbij, the temple of Serapis in Ashkelon, and the temple of Nasr in Himyar.
 The order of the blessings is YaQNeHaSZ: first Yayin, then Qiddush, then Ner, then Havdalah, then Sukkah, then Z'man.
 The halakha follows Judah ha-Nasi for Sabbath matters.

Biblical lineages 

 Elimelech, Boaz, and Naomi were descendants of Nahshon.
 Haman's father was ʾĂmatlaʾy batʿÔrebtî.
 Abraham's mother was ʾĂmatlaʾy bat Karnebo.
 David's mother was Niṣṣebet bat ʿAdʾēl.
 Samson's mother was Ṣǝlelpônît, and his sister was Nǝšêq.
 Abraham was imprisoned for 10 years: 3 years in Kutha and 7 years in Kardu.
 When Abraham died, the leaders of the world's nations stood in a line and said "Woe to the world that has lost its leader, and woe to the ship that has lost its captain".

Other Teachings 

 There are four types of s'lav: sikhli, partridge, pasianus, and sh'lav. The best of all is the sikhli, and the worst of all is the sh'lav.
 One may roof their Sukkah with thorns and shrubs.
 If the Ḥazzan begins a chapter of Psalms, there is a mitzvah to respond, repeating the first verse.
 Kalenda is held for the eight days after the winter solstice. Saturnalia is held for the eight days before the winter solstice.
 If you own the four species, you do not have to lift all four.
 All know for what purpose a bride enters the bridal canopy. Yet against whomsoever speaks obscenely thereof, even if a sentence of seventy years happiness has been sealed for him, it is reversed for evil.
 Abraham served his guests three calf tongues with mustard, food ordinarily reserved for kings and ministers.
 "Haššǝsûʿâ" in Deuteronomy 14:7 (usually translated as "that are split through") refers to a specific animal called the Šǝsûʿâ, which has two backs and two spines.

Notes

References 

3rd-century people
290 deaths
Year of death uncertain
Year of birth unknown